Ingrid Tuk—also known as Ineke Tuk, Ingrid Tuk-Jansen and Ingrid Jansen—won the Dutch Chess Championship for women in 1968 after Corry Vreeken won three consecutive championships in 1962, 1964 and 1966.

After this success Ingrid wasn't heard of for several years until a Dutch journalist, Max Pam, at the end of the seventies, was asked to provide interviews with two female chess players, one of whom was Ingrid Tuk. He ended up finding her in a strip club in Amsterdam—under the name of Ingrid Jansen—and actually paid her rate of 102 Dutch guilders (at the time around $35) for an interview. During the interview Ingrid told Max that she had stopped playing chess because of the rivalry between the female chess champions. She now made better money, and she wasn't ashamed of what she did for a living.

It wasn't until 2008 that Ingrid returned as a chess player at a local chess club in Steenwijk. She also plays with the Dutch provincial Frisian Chess Union (Friese Schaakbond) en participates in the 2010 Frisian Chess Championships.

References

Year of birth missing (living people)
Living people
Dutch female chess players